The 2015 Putrajaya ePrix (officially the Y Capital Management Putrajaya ePrix), was a Formula E motor race held on 7 November 2015 at the Putrajaya Street Circuit in Putrajaya, Malaysia. It was the second edition of the Putrajaya ePrix and the second championship race of the 2015–16 Formula E season. The race was won by Lucas di Grassi.

Report

Background
The Trulli team did not participate in Putrajaya; they already failed to participate two weeks earlier in Beijing. This time, the team presented its Motormatica JT-01 for scrutineering, but the car did not pass all of the mandatory checks.

Classifications

Qualifying

Notes:
 – Final grid position of top five qualifiers determined by Super Pole shootout.

Super Pole

Race

Notes:
 – Three points for pole position and two points for fastest lap.

Standings after the race

Drivers' Championship standings

Teams' Championship standings

 Notes: Only the top five positions are included for both sets of standings.

References

|- style="text-align:center"
|width="35%"|Previous race:2015 Beijing ePrix
|width="30%"|FIA Formula E Championship2015–16 season
|width="35%"|Next race:2015 Punta del Este ePrix
|- style="text-align:center"
|width="35%"|Previous race:2014 Putrajaya ePrix
|width="30%"|Putrajaya ePrix
|width="35%"|Next race:TBD
|- style="text-align:center"

Putrajaya ePrix
Putrajaya ePrix
Putrajaya ePrix